The Wilson House at 75 N. 5th St. in Cambridge in Washington County, Idaho was built in 1903.  It was listed on the National Register of Historic Places in 2004.

It is a one-and-a-half-story, wood frame, Late Victorian house that may be characterized as Queen Anne in style for its exterior and interior details.

It was built by/for Riel and Etta Wilson.

References

Houses on the National Register of Historic Places in Idaho
Queen Anne architecture in Idaho
Houses completed in 1903
Washington County, Idaho